Gamaliel Henry Butler (5 June 1854 – 15 July 1914) was an Australian politician.

He was born in Hobart. In 1896 he was elected to the Tasmanian Legislative Council representing Hobart. He was Chief Secretary from 1909 until his death in 1914.

References

1854 births
1914 deaths
Independent members of the Parliament of Tasmania
Members of the Tasmanian Legislative Council